Heinz Hohner (1907–1967) was the mayor of Augsburg, Germany, between 1946 and 1947. He was a member of the Christian Social Union of Bavaria. His father was a prosecutor. He studied legal science in Munich, Kiel, Berlin, Freiburg and Würzburg, where he was promoted.

See also
List of mayors of Augsburg

1907 births
1967 deaths
Mayors of Augsburg